is a railway station and metro station complex in Tennōji-ku, Osaka, Japan. It is on the Osaka Loop Line of West Japan Railway Company (JR West) and the Nagahori Tsurumi-ryokuchi Line of Osaka Metro.

Lines
West Japan Railway Company (JR West)
Osaka Loop Line
Osaka Metro
Nagahori Tsurumi-ryokuchi Line (Station Number: N19)

Layout

JR West Osaka Loop Line
There are two side platforms with two tracks elevated.

Osaka Metro Nagahori Tsurumi-ryokuchi Line
There is an island platform fenced with platform gates between 2 tracks underground.

Surroundings

Schools
Osaka Prefectural Shimizudani High School
Josei Gakuen Junior and Senior High School
Osaka Jogakuin Junior and Senior High School
Meisei Junior and Senior High School
Osaka Jogakuin College and Junior College

Head offices
Morishita Jintan Co., Ltd.
Kyocera Mita Corporation

Others
Dondoro Taishi Zempuku-ji
Tamatsukuri Inari Shrine

History 
Station numbering was introduced to the JR Line in March 2018 with Osaka Loop Line platforms being assigned station number JR-O05.

Stations next to Tamatsukuri

References 

Railway stations in Osaka Prefecture
Osaka Metro stations
Railway stations in Japan opened in 1895
Railway stations in Japan opened in 1996